The 2020–21 Japan Golf Tour was a series of professional golf tournaments organised by the Japan Golf Tour Organization.

The 2020 season was originally scheduled to be played from 16 January to 6 December 2020, and comprised 25 official money events, mostly in Japan. Other than the four majors, which are played outside Japan, there was one event in Singapore and one event in South Korea; the SMBC Singapore Open which is co-sanctioned by the Asian Tour, and the Shinhan Donghae Open which is co-sanctioned by the Asian Tour and the Korean Tour.

Most of the scheduled tournaments were cancelled during 2020 due to COVID-19 pandemic. On 25 December 2020, the tour announced the schedule for 2021 and confirmed that it would be merged with the 2020 schedule to form the 2020–21 season.

Schedule
The following table lists official events during the 2020–21 season.

Unofficial events
The following events were sanctioned by the Japan Golf Tour, but did not carry official money, nor were wins official.

Money list
The money list was based on prize money won during the season, calculated in Japanese yen.

Notes

References

External links

Japan Golf Tour
Japan Golf Tour
Japan Golf Tour
Golf Tour
Golf Tour